Bratřice is a municipality and village in Pelhřimov District in the Vysočina Region of the Czech Republic. It has about 100 inhabitants.

Administrative parts
The village of Cetule is an administrative part of Bratřice.

References

Villages in Pelhřimov District